Tutuki Splash is a water ride, opened in 1995 at PortAventura Park in the resort PortAventura World, Salou, Spain. It is located on an artificial volcano in the Polynesia section of the park. The ride begins with a slow, gentle river, followed by a dark tunnel around a bend, and a small drop where a photograph of the passengers is taken. There is no lift needed for the drop as the station is on elevated ground. There is another slow river and a steep lift hill. At the top, the raft plunges down a drop reaching the highest speed of the ride (35 mph). It floats back to the station while onlookers can spray passengers with water from the bridge above.

See also
PortAventura World
Water ride
Tidal Wave (Thorpe Park)

References
http://www.portaventura.co.uk/
http://www.portaventura.co.uk/portaventura/html/PortAventura_Park/Atracciones/Polynesia/Tutuki_Splash.html
http://www.coasterforce.com/index.php?categoryid=222
http://www.s104638357.websitehome.co.uk/html/tutukisplash_main.htm

External links
http://www.portaventura.co.uk/

Amusement rides introduced in 1995